Soho Lights is the debut album by UK-based band TAT. The album was released on October 28, 2008.

Track listing
"Road To Paradise" – 3:08
"Sympathetic Lies" – 3:42
"Pessimist" – 3:27
"Stay Up" – 3:53
"I Don't Want To (Love You)" – 3:25
"Everything I Want" – 3:18
"Here's To You" – 3:29
"Diamond Child" – 3:03
"Taking It All" – 3:14
"Sandra Dee" – 3:52
"Take You Home" – 2:50
"You Hero" – 3:05
"Live For Rock" – 2:40
Bonus Tracks
<li>"Champagne, Cocaine & Strawberries" – 2:55
<li>"Bloodstain" – 2:51

Personnel
Tatiana DeMaria – vocals, guitar
Nick Kent – bass, vocals
Jake Reed – drums, vocals

Information
All Tracks written by Tatiana DeMaria except:
 8 written by Tatiana DeMaria and Jake Reed
 2 written by Tatiana DeMaria and Paddy Jordan
 6, 9 & 11 written by Tatiana DeMaria and Johnny Andrews
 7 written by Tatiana DeMaria and Jeff Franzel

2008 debut albums
TAT (band) albums